Mohd Akmal bin Md Zahir (born 16 February 1994) is a Malaysian professional footballer who plays as a centre-back for Malaysia Super League club Kedah Darul Aman.

Club career

Kedah Darul Aman
On 4 June 2022, Akmal signed for Malaysia Super League club Kedah Darul Aman.

Career statistics

Club

References

External links

Living people
1994 births
People from Kedah
Malaysian people of Malay descent
Malaysian footballers
Sime Darby F.C. players
UKM F.C. players
Melaka United F.C. players
Kedah Darul Aman F.C. players
Association football central defenders